Hongtangying (Chinese: 洪塘营瑶族乡) is the most remote of 3 Yao ethnic minority townships in southeastern Dao County, Yongzhou, rural Hunan, China. Hongtangying has at least 47 villages, with thousands of women and children. The town is located within the Jiuyi Mountains

Location 
Hongtingying's location on Google Maps is exactly the coordinates of its township committee (its government office), the committee is located on the 071 county road (X071) and is surrounded by several other complexed, surrounding small roads, a sign of significant population density. Google's satellite imagery shows Hongtangying consists mainly of organized farms and forests, with occasional large households sometimes located on main roads. The town also has its center town village (Hongtangyingcun)

Hongtangying is on the Yangtze Tectonic Plate in Asia. The two following tables show distances of places from the center of Hongtangying, the first table, showing 10 villages of Hongtangying, and the second showing a variety of different places including mines and deposits.

Obstetrics 
Until 2008, Hongtangying only had one obstetrician, Yuan Lianjiao, who treats 1,200 patients each year, and has delivered over 3,000 babies. The obstetrician had reduced maternal mortality in Hongtangying and eradicated tetanus among newborns.

Business 
Hongtangying is home to a company named Peng Yixing, formed in Langnihu Village of Hongtangying. The company's trademark was organized in September 2020. There are several other businesses and personal loans (banks) in Hongtangying.

History 
In 1967, the Yao population of the township was 'assimilated into the dominant Han culture. In 1967, Pan Jiarui was the township's CCP secretary and he 'demonstrated his revolutionary mettle by establishing militias and calling several "four chiefs" meetings, during which he criticised some brigades'. 'The production brigade (village) of Huangjiatang was situated in the northernmost portion of Hongtangying, bordering Gongba Village'. Four members of a landlord's offspring, Yang Jieqiao's family were killed in the township in late August 1967, Yang himself managed to escape and 'sought refuge with relatives in the Miaoziyuan brigade of Jianghua County'. In 1967, Hongtangying had a primary school located on mountainous terrain, at the time, being a school teacher was one of many civilian jobs that someone could be transferred to from the military.

Climate 
Hongtangying has a humid subtropical climate and a site on The Weather Network.

References 

Yao ethnic townships
Geography of Dao County
Townships of Hunan